The 2016 North Carolina Central Eagles football team represented North Carolina Central University in the 2016 NCAA Division I FCS football season. They were led by third-year head coach Jerry Mack. The Eagles played their home games at O'Kelly–Riddick Stadium. They were a member of the Mid-Eastern Athletic Conference (MEAC). They finished the season 9–3, 8–0 in MEAC play to win the MEAC title to play in the Celebration Bowl, where they were defeated by SWAC champions Grambling State.

Schedule

Source: Schedule

Game summaries

at Duke

at Western Michigan

Saint Augustine's

at Norfolk State

at Bethune-Cookman

Florida A&M

Savannah State

at Morgan State

at Delaware State

Howard

North Carolina A&T

Celebration Bowl–Grambling State

Ranking movements

References

North Carolina Central
North Carolina Central Eagles football seasons
Mid-Eastern Athletic Conference football champion seasons
North Carolina Central Eagles football